Amy King (born August 3, 1971) is an American poet, essayist, and activist.

Early life and education 

Born in Baltimore, Maryland, King grew up in Stone Mountain, Georgia and received her B.S. in English and women's studies from Towson University. She received her M.A. in American studies (poetics concentration) at State University of New York Buffalo, and an M.F.A. from Brooklyn College in creative writing.

Career 
Since 2003, King has taught English and creative writing at SUNY Nassau Community College. She has also guest-lectured and conducted workshops at a number of colleges and universities, including Goddard College, Naropa University, RISD (Rhode Island School of Design), San Francisco State University, Slippery Rock University, and Salem College Center for Women Writers.

King received the 2015 WNBA Award (Women's National Book Association). She also received The Feminist Press' "40 Under 40: The Future of Feminism" award in 2010 and the 2012 SUNY Chancellor's Award for Excellence in Scholarship and Creative Activities.

In 2016, Adam Fitzgerald named King "One of the 30 Poets You Should Be Reading", and she was listed as one of "13 New York Poets Changing the Lit Scene" by Civil Coping Mechanisms in March 2017.

She moderates the Women's Poetry Listserv (WOMPO) and the Goodreads Poetry! Group, which includes more than 20,000 members and features the monthly "Goodreads Newsletter Poetry Contest". She also serves on The Offing Magazine's Advisory Board.

King has published five full-length poetry collections, including Antidotes for an Alibi (BlazeVOX Books 2005), I’m the Man Who Loves You (BlazeVOX Books 2007, Slaves to do These Things (BlazeVOX Books 2009), I Want to Make You Safe (Litmus Press 2011) and The Missing Museum (Tarpaulin Sky Press 2016).

She is co-editor of the anthology series Bettering American Poetry (Bettering Books) and, with Heidi Lynn Staples, the anthology, Big Energy Poets: Ecopoetry Thinks Climate Change (Blazevox Books 2017).

From 2010 – 2014, she co-edited the online response to the BP Gulf Oil Spill, Poets for Living Waters, with Heidi Lynn Staples and co-edited the PEN America Poetry Series with Ana Bozicevic in 2010. For many years, she moderated the POETICS list, sponsored by The Electronic Poetry Center (SUNY-Buffalo/University of Pennsylvania).

King founded and curated, from 2006, the Brooklyn-based reading series, The Stain of Poetry, until 2010.

Activism 
A founding member (2009) of the literary arts activist organization, Vida: Women in Literary Arts, King currently serves on the Executive Board and is the press officer and Editor-in-Chief of the VIDA Review. Known for its annual report on the rates of publication between male and female authors, in 2014, the VIDA Count expanded to include race, sexual orientation and writers with disabilities. The VIDA Count has been influential in rendering visible a lack of parity in contemporary American literary publishing, thus promoting industry attention and discussion around issues of bias.

In March 2015, King publicly critiqued University of Pennsylvania's adjunct lecturer Kenneth Goldsmith’s controversial performance at RISD of his poem, ""The Body of Michael Brown" in her essay, "Why Are People So Invested in Kenneth Goldsmith?".

In August 2015, King curated and contributed to a forum for Poetry Foundation that raised the question, "What Is Literary Activism?", which resulted in online debate about the merits of literary activism.

In 2016, she spoke out about the Swedish Academy’s decision to award Bob Dylan the Nobel Prize in Literature.

Awards 
 2000 MacArthur Scholarship for Poetry
 2001 Pavement Saw Press Chapbook Award Series – “The People Instruments”
 2015 WNBA Award (Women’s National Book Association)
 2015 THE MISSING MUSEUM – Tarpaulin Sky Book Prize

Bibliography

Collections 
 The People Instruments. Pavement Saw Press. 2001. .
 The Citizen's Dilemma. Duration Press. 2003.
 Antidotes for an Alibi. BlazeVOX Books. 2005. .
 I’m the Man Who Loves You. BlazeVOX Books. 2007. .
 Slaves to do These Things. BlazeVOX Books. 2009. .
 I Want to Make You Safe. Litmus Press. 2011. . 
 The Missing Museum. Tarpaulin Sky Press. 2016. .

Editor 
 Amy King, Vanessa Angelica Villarreal, Nikki Wallschlaeger, Sarah Clark, Airea D Matthews, Kenzie Allen, Eunsong Kim, Jason Koo, David Tomas Martinez, Hector Ramirez, Metta Sama, ed (2017). Bettering American Poetry 2015. Bettering Books. .
 Heidi Lynn Staples, Amy King, ed (2017). Big Energy Poets: Ecopoetry Thinks Climate Change. Blazevox Books. .

Poems 
 "String Theory". Boston Review. April 2013. 
 "Understanding the Poem". Connotation Press. December 2013.
 "Wings of Desire". Poetry Magazine. January 2014.
 "FAME IS NOT SEXUALLY TRANSMITTED". Hyperallergic. February 2014. 
 "WAKE BEFORE DAWN & SALT THE SEA". Dia: Readings in Contemporary Poetry. December 2015. 
 "Two If By Land, I Do". Brooklyn Poets. June 2015. 
 "Poem-A-Day – 'You Make the Culture'". USA Today. August 2015. 
 "Perspective". Poetry Foundation. September 2016. 
 “From Ellis Island” and “Imprison, Deport, Repeat". The Guardian. Summer 2017. 
 "Ancient Sunlight". Academy of American Poets. August 2017.
 “All Sex All the Time” and “Feel Up the Light". Diagram. May 2020.

Essays 
 "The What Else of Queer Poetry". Free Verse: A Journal of Contemporary Poetry & Politics. 2010.
 "On Alice Walker's 'The Color Purple'". PEN America. October 2012.
 "BEAUTY AND THE BEASTLY PO-BIZ".The Rumpus. July 2013.
 "Poetry: This Death Is Incomplete". Boston Review. July 2013. 
 "Poets’ Roundtable on Person and Persona". Amy King and Cate Marvin. Los Angeles Review of Books. October 2013.
 "Whacked Out: A Case for the Advocacy of the Unlisted". Poetry Magazine. January 2014. 
 "Threat Level: Poetry". Boston Review. February 2014. 
 "WHY ARE PEOPLE SO INVESTED IN KENNETH GOLDSMITH? OR, IS COLONIALIST POETRY EASY?". VIDA Review. March 2015.
 "Call and Response: The Gifts of Women Poets". Poetry Foundation. August 2015. 
 "Young Poets Bare All: What Is a Culture?". Poetry Foundation. August 2015.
 "What Is Literary Activism?". Poetry Foundation. August 2015.
 "And the Occasion Changed: A Tribute to John Ashbery". Poetry Foundation. September 2017.

Interviews 
 "AN INTERVIEW WITH AMY KING" by Elizabeth Hildreth. Bookslut. January 2010. 
 "I Like Amy King A Lot" by Roxane Gay. HTMLGIANT. March 2010.
 "The Poetry Feminaissance" by Travis Nichols. Huffington Post. June 2010.
 "Amy King Interview" by Derek Alger. PIF Magazine. January 2011.
 "No Place for the Little Lyric: Should Adrienne Rich be the poet laureate of the Occupy movement?". Poetry Foundation. December 2011. 
 "Amy King: Phoned-In #16" by Luke Degnan and Gigi Augsbach. Bomb Magazine. March 2012. 
 "New York Poet, Amy King, Heads To Texas" by Catherine Lu. Houston Public Media. December 2014. 
 "Q&A: American Poetry with Amy King" at Poetry Society of America. 2014.
 "Perspective: Amy King considers how the media represent race and police violence." Produced by Katie Klocksin. Poetry Foundation. September 2016.
 "Sexism in the Literary World".The Center for Fiction [video]. October 2016.
 "Bettering American Poetry with Amy King" by Loren Kleinman. Huffington Post. April 2017.
 "Q&A with Amy King from VIDA, Feminist Watchdog" by Joanna R. Demkiewicz. The Riveter. August 2017.

References

External links 
 "Amy King", Academy of American Poets
 "Amy King", Poetry Foundation
 "Amy King", AWP – Association of Writers and Writing Programs
 Author website 
 "Amy King", PennSound: Center for Programs in Contemporary Writing

1971 births
Living people
People from Baltimore
People from Stone Mountain, Georgia
State University of New York faculty
Towson University alumni
Brooklyn College alumni
Writers from Maryland
Writers from New York City
American women poets
21st-century American women writers
American non-fiction writers
21st-century American poets
21st-century American essayists
American activists
American women essayists
University at Buffalo alumni
American women academics